Miguel Sánchez may refer to:

Miguel Sánchez (priest) (1594–1674), Novohispanic priest, writer and theologian
Miguel Ángel Sánchez (Argentine footballer) (1936–2008)
Miguel A. Sanchez, Spanish-American pathologist
Miguel Ángel Sánchez (cyclist) (born 1943), Costa Rican Olympic cyclist
Miguel Sánchez Carreño (born 1948), Mexican politician
Miguel Sánchez-Ostiz (born 1950), Spanish writer
Míchel (footballer, born 1975) (Miguel Ángel Sánchez Muñoz), Spanish footballer
Julian Sanchez (writer) (Miguel Julian Sanchez, born 1979), American journalist
Miguel Ángel Sánchez (Nicaraguan footballer) (born 1980), Nicaraguan footballer
Miguel Sánchez Rincón (born 1988), Mexican footballer
Miguel Sánchez (baseball) (born 1993), Dominican baseball player
Miguel Sánchez-Migallón (born 1995), Spanish handball player

See also
Miguel Angel Sanchez (disambiguation)
Michael Sanchez (disambiguation)
Mike Sanchez (Jesus Miguel Sanchez, born 1964), British musician